Steve Hilgenberg (November 26, 1944 – March 27, 2011) was a Democratic member of the Wisconsin State Assembly, representing the 51st Assembly District 2007–2011. He was a member of the Committees on Insurance, Rural Economic Development, and Small Business.

Hilgenberg attended the University of Wisconsin and Madison Area Technical College. He served in the United States Army from 1966 to 1969 during the Vietnam era. He was the former owner and operator of a commercial printing business and a former member of the Dodgeville School Board.

In 2010, Hilgenberg announced he would not seek re-election due to health concerns.

He died of prostate cancer on March 27, 2011.

Notes

External links
 Follow the Money - Steve Hilgenberg
2008 2006 campaign contributions
Campaign 2008 campaign contributions at Wisconsin Democracy Campaign

Politicians from Appleton, Wisconsin
People from Dodgeville, Wisconsin
Madison Area Technical College alumni
University of Wisconsin–Madison alumni
Businesspeople from Wisconsin
Democratic Party members of the Wisconsin State Assembly
1944 births
2011 deaths
21st-century American politicians
Deaths from prostate cancer
Deaths from cancer in Wisconsin
20th-century American businesspeople